J. B. Gilbert House is a historic home located at Hartsville, Darlington County, South Carolina.  It was built in 1929, and is a two-story, brick Tudor Revival style residence.  It has a cross gable slate roof, limestone trim, decorative ironwork, half timbering, and herringbone brickwork in the gables. It was the home of John Barton Gilbert (1891-1953), a prominent Hartsville manufacturer and businessman. Gilbert served Sonoco first as a salesman, then an accountant, and finally as corporate treasurer.

It was listed on the National Register of Historic Places in 1991.

References

Houses on the National Register of Historic Places in South Carolina
Tudor Revival architecture in South Carolina
Houses completed in 1929
Houses in Hartsville, South Carolina
National Register of Historic Places in Darlington County, South Carolina